Microbacterium sorbitolivorans is a Gram-positive and facultatively anaerobic bacterium from the genus Microbacterium which has been isolated from a fermentation bed of a pigpen in Xiamen, China.

References

External links
Type strain of Microbacterium sorbitolivorans at BacDive -  the Bacterial Diversity Metadatabase

Bacteria described in 2016
sorbitolivorans